The Church of St Mary in Mudford, Somerset, England, dates from the 14th century and has been designated as a Grade I listed building.

The church was granted by Montacute Priory to the Bishop of Bath and Wells in 1339. The interior includes a Jacobean pulpit and a stone font from the 15th century.

There is a stair turret on the north-east corner with a weathervane finial, and a clock face on the east side. It contains five bells dated 1582, 1621, 1623, 1664 and 1666, all by the Purdue family of nearby Closworth. The tower was rebuilt in 1309 and again in the early 20th century following a lightning strike.

The parish is part of the benefice of Chilton Cantelo, Ashington, Marston Magna, Mudford and Rimpton within the Yeovil deanery.

Due to the condition of the high level stonework the church has been added to the Heritage at Risk Register; however repairs were undertaken in 2013 to correct this.

See also

 Grade I listed buildings in South Somerset
 List of Somerset towers
 List of ecclesiastical parishes in the Diocese of Bath and Wells

References

External links
 St Mary The Virgin

14th-century church buildings in England
Church of England church buildings in South Somerset
Grade I listed churches in Somerset
Grade I listed buildings in South Somerset
Structures on the Heritage at Risk register in Somerset